Nigambodh Ghat is located on the banks of the Yamuna river coast in New Delhi, situated on the Ring Road, Delhi at the back of  the historic Red Fort. It consists of a series of bathing and ceremonial stepped piers leading to the waters of the river. It is most known for being the oldest burning ghat in Delhi for performing Antyesti (Antim Sanskar), Hindu funeral rites and also one of its busiest with 50–60 pyres burning every day. It also has an electric crematorium built in the 1950s and a CNG-run crematorium was added by the Municipal corporation with manages the cremation facilities in 2006.

Etymology
It is believed that it was on this ghat during the Mahabharat era, Lord Brahma, Hindu God of Creation, had bathed and recovered his lost memory and sacred books and hence the name Nigambodh Ghat, literally realization of knowledge.

Overview
It is believed that the ghats were established by the eldest Pandava brother, Prince Yudhishthira, the king of Indraprastha. At present, the ghat area includes the largest and busiest cremation ground of New Delhi, where the Antyesti, Hindu funeral rites are carried out.

Nili Chatri mandir dedicated to Lord Shiva, also established by Yudhishthira and Nigambodh Gate lie adjacent to the ghats, which one of last gates of the walled city of Old Delhi (Shahjahanabad) built during Mughal Empire.

References

External links
 Nigambodh Ghat wikimapia

Neighbourhoods in Delhi
New Delhi
Ghats of India
Yamuna River